Dalbergia simpsonii is a species of legume in the family Fabaceae.
It is found only in Peru.

References

Sources

simpsonii
Flora of Peru
Vulnerable plants
Taxonomy articles created by Polbot